The Waiting Years (originally published under the title 女坂 Onnazaka) is a novel by Fumiko Enchi, set within the milieu of an upper-class Japanese family in the last years of the 19th century.  It was first published in 1957 and won the Noma Prize.  An English translation, by  John Bester, has been published by Kodansha.  The novel is primarily set in the district of Asakusa and Fukushima Prefecture.

References 

Novel articles needing attention
Works by Japanese writers
Novels set in Japan
1957 novels
Asakusa
20th-century Japanese novels